Robyn Mawdsley (born 3 May 1971) is an Australian former professional tennis player.

Biography
Mawdsley competed on the professional tour in the 1990s, after playing college tennis in the United States for Texas A&M.

In ger career, Mawdsley reached a best singles ranking of No. 366 in the world. She was more successful on tour as a doubles player. Ranked as high as 182 for doubles, she twice featured in the main draw of the Australian Open, in 1991 and 1994. She won a total of six doubles titles on the ITF Women's Circuit, four of which came in 1995.

ITF finals

Singles (0–1)

Doubles (6–12)

References

External links
 
 

1971 births
Living people
Australian female tennis players
Texas A&M Aggies women's tennis players